The Snow Fell Three Graves Deep: Voices from the Donner Party is a fictional, poetic retelling of the historic Donner Party's expedition into the Sierra Nevada Mountains. The book is written by Allan Wolf, published September 8, 2020 by Candlewick Press.

Reception 
The Snow Fell Three Graves Deep received starred reviews from BookPage, Booklist, Shelf Awareness for Readers, and The Horn Book, as well as the following accolades:

 American Library Association's Best Fiction for Young Adults (2021)
 Kansas NEA Reading Circle Recommended Title (2021)
 Los Angeles Times Book Prize for Young Adult Literature finalist 
 Cooperative Children’s Book Center Choices Book List

References 

Donner Party
Donner family
American historical novels
American poetry books